PharmaSecure is a U.S.-based software and technology company.

History
PharmaSecure was founded by Nathan Sigworth and N. Taylor Thompson in 2007. The company was started to address the problem of counterfeit pharmaceuticals. The original technology provided consumers with the opportunity to verify that their medicines are authentic by using a unique identifier on the package and a cell phone. As of 2014, the company issued IDs to more than 1 billion medicine packs.

In July 2012, PharmaSecure became the first company to partner with the INTERPOL Global Register.

Company Profile
The company is currently headquartered in Lebanon, New Hampshire, with a subsidiary operation in India, and is funded through private investment. PharmaSecure is a global track-and-trace, product authentication and consumer engagement company that has helped protect over 1.8 billion packages through its technology-enabled solutions by 2011.

Activities
In 2010, the founder announced the going-on discussion for Product Authentication services with 50 major Indian Pharma Companies,

References 

American companies established in 2007
Technology companies of the United States